Ghislain Cloquet (18 April 1924 – 2 November 1981) was a Belgian-born French cinematographer. Cloquet was born in Antwerp, Belgium in 1924. He went to Paris to study and became a French citizen in 1940.

Cloquet is known for his work with Robert Bresson, though he also collaborated with Claude Sautet, Jacques Demy, André Delvaux, Chris Marker, and Marguerite Duras. He shot Jacques Becker's last film, Le Trou, and then worked several times with Becker's son Jean, who was Cloquet's brother-in-law. He also worked with several non-French directors, including Woody Allen (Love and Death), Arthur Penn (Four Friends), and, most notably, Roman Polanski, winning an Oscar (on his first nomination) for his work on Polanski's Tess, which he completed after the death of Geoffrey Unsworth.

Cloquet married into the Becker filmmaking family (which included directors Jacques and Jean, cinematographer Étienne, and actress Françoise Fabian), when he wed Jacques Becker's daughter Sophie, then a script girl.

External links

Ghislain Cloquet profile at the Internet Encyclopedia of Cinematographers

1924 births
1981 deaths
Best Cinematographer Academy Award winners
Best Cinematography BAFTA Award winners
César Award winners
Belgian emigrants to France
French cinematographers
Mass media people from Antwerp